Joseph Mundassery (17 July 1903  – 25 October 1977) was a literary critic and Indian politician from Kerala state. He specialised in the Malayalam language and literature. In Kerala politics, he is remembered as the Education Minister who was behind the controversial Education Bill of the first EMS communist ministry of 1957.

Early life
Joseph Mundassery was born at Kandasankadavu, Thrissur. After his schooling locally he took his bachelor's degree in Physics and later a master's degree in Sanskrit and Malayalam. Until 1952, he was the Head of the Department of Foreign Languages at St. Thomas College, Trichur.

Mundassery entered politics through the Kochi Prajamandalam and was elected as a Member of the Legislative Council (MLC) of the princely state of Cochin in 1948 from the constituency of Aranattukara. Later on, he became an MLC in the Travancore-Cochin Assembly in 1954, from Cherpu.

After the formation of the state of Kerala in 1956, he won the Assembly election in 1957, from Manalur, and went on to become Kerala's first Education Minister (1957–59) in the EMS Communist ministry. Finally, in 1970, he was elected as an MLA from Trichur constituency.

A doyen of letters and a cultural leader
 
As a prominent figure in the field of Malayalam literary criticism, Mundassery was one among a well-known trio of Malayalam critics, the others being Kesari Balakrishna Pillai and M. P. Paul.

Through his controversial theory about Rooparbhadrata – formal excellence – Mundassery ushered in a new chapter of literary hermeneutics, which was unheard of in Malayalam until then. According to the theory, the proclaimed aim of the author would inevitably lead to intentional fallacy, and an author should be evaluated on more objective criteria like his role as a spokesman of his age.

He was the President of the Kerala Sahithya Parishad from 1965 to 1967, and an executive (and a founding) member of the Kerala Sahitya Akademi. He was also instrumental in establishing the Kerala Sangeetha Nataka Akademi.

As an educationist
 
Mundassery's notability as an educationist rests partly on the reforms that he partially succeeded in bringing about in the educational sector in Kerala when he was the Education Minister. He authored the controversial Education Bill of the First communist ministry of Kerala. To a great extent, the proposed bill directly led to the snowballing of the Vimochana Samaram and the subsequent downfall of the E.M.S. Namboodiripad's first communist ministry in 1959.

Even though the Bill failed to pass through the Assembly, many of its provisions were later implemented by subsequent governments, albeit with amendments. As the Education Minister of the first democratically elected ministry of the newly formed State of Kerala, Mundassery was instrumental in the establishment and restructuring of some of the early universities and prime educational institutions of the state, having had experience as the Vice Chancellor of the Cochin University of Science and Technology.

Mundassery was the guru of many pupils at St. Thomas College, Trichur, among whom were some of the future leaders of Kerala such as C. Achutha Menon and Mathai Manjooran.

Mundassery died in 1977.

Books
 Literary criticism: Karuna Nirupanam (1939), Mattoli (1943), Anthareeksham (1944), Kavyapeetika (1945), Manadandham (1946), Prayanam (1947), Karinthiri (1951), Roopa Bhadratha (1951), Kalathinte Kannadi (1954), Puthiya Kazhchappadil (1955), Rajarajante Mattoli (1961), Natakantham Kavithwam (1962), Prabhaashanaavali (1967), Pashchathya Sahithya Sameeksha (1967), Nanayaathe Meen Pidikkamo (1967), Vayanashalayil (1949-69; in four parts), Asan Kavitha: Oru Patanam (1971), Vallathol Kavitha: Oru Patanam (1971)

 Poetry: Chinthamadhuri (1928)

 Short story: Randu Rajakumarimar (1938), Sammaanam (1943), Illapolice (1947), Kadaksham

 Novel: Professor (1948), Konthayil Ninnu Kurissilekku (1954), Parappurathu Vithacha Vithu (1966)

 Autobiography: Kozhinja Ilakal (in three parts) (1960, 1965, 1976)

 Biography: Maxim Gorky (1952), Budhiman Jeevikkunnu (1965)

 Essays: Viswaviharam (1934), Prabandha Deepika (1936), Matham Avideyum Ivideyum (1955), Pothuvidyabhyasam Enthu Engane (1961), Vyakthiyil Ninnu Pouranilekk (1962), Shastram Jeevithathil (1964), Upanyasa Deepika (1964)

 Travelogue: China Munnottu (1953), Otta Nottathil

 Miscellaneous: Neenda Kathukal (1956), Kristhvanukaranam (1936), Stuntukal (1956)

References
 Mundassery.org
 Visvavijnanakosham, 1971 edition.
 Joseph Mundassery Scholarship

External links 
 

1903 births
1977 deaths
People from Thrissur district
Malayalam-language writers
Writers from Kerala
Malayali politicians
St. Thomas College, Thrissur alumni
Kerala MLAs 1970–1977
Education Ministers of Kerala
Kerala MLAs 1957–1959
Communist Party of India politicians from Kerala